Morris Kahn (born 5 March 1930) is an Israeli billionaire entrepreneur. He is the founder of Golden Pages Israel, Amdocs, the Aurec Group, Coral World and other companies. Through Coral World, he founded several marine parks around the world, including an underwater observatory in Eilat, Israel. As of March 2022, his net worth is estimated at US$1.0 billion.

Early life
Morris Kahn was born in March 1930 in Benoni, South Africa, to a Jewish family. He is the eldest child of Philip and Beattie Kahn. He was an active member of the Zionist youth group, Habonim.

In 1956, Kahn moved from South Africa to Israel with his wife, Jacqueline Maloon, and their two sons, Benjamin and David.

Business ventures
Kahn’s business career in Israel began with a few business ventures, including a bicycle factory in Beit Shemesh in partnership with Kibbutz Tzora; and a cattle company in the Northern Galilee.

In 1978 Kahn and Shmuel Meitar founded the Aurec Group, an Israeli-based private equity firm which started with investments in the cable and telecom sectors. This led to the installation of a fiber optic cable from Israel to Italy, which connected Israel to the rest of the world.

His first major success began with the establishment of the Golden Pages telephone directory in Israel in 1968, which led to the co-founding of Amdocs in 1982, together with Shmuel and Tzvi Meitar. Amdocs provides customer relationship management and billing software for big telecommunications firms. The company, which is traded on NASDAQ (revenue in fiscal 2015: $3.6 billion) currently serves more than 300 clients in more than 90 countries, and has about 26,000 employees.

Aurec also owns Golden Channels, Israel's first cable company, founded in 1989 and Golden Lines, Israel's first international communications company, founded in 1996.

In 1997 the Aurec Group acquired 50% of Netcom, the launch of AIG Golden Insurance and Alpha Visa-Card.

He is a principal investor in Aurum Ventures and the clean tech water company Atlantium, that uses UV rays to disinfect water, and N-Trig, a manufacturer of multi-touch screens for computers. In 2016 Aurum Ventures invested $3 million in a new method of diagnosing cancer developed by Noklaiks (Nucleix) Israel.

Time to Know is a digital education platform which Kahn first launched as a nonprofit organization focused on improving grade school education.

Kahn, a former diver, founded Coral World International, a group of aquariums around the world in Eilat, Israel; Maui, Hawaii; Perth, Australia; St. Thomas, US Virgin Islands; Coral Island Nassau, The Bahamas; Oceanworld in Manly, Australia; and elsewhere.

Philanthropy 
Kahn supports the work of Save a Child's Heart (SACH), an organization that brings israeli doctors around the world to perform life-saving surgery and medical monitoring for children of all races, religions, nationalities, and economic status.

The Morris Kahn Initiative is a $4 million program to help develop pioneering cancer research at Tel Aviv University. The initiative’s aim is to develop 3D cancer modeling of live cancer tumors.

“Big Data Maccabi,” founded with contributions from Kahn, will help medical professionals to diagnose illness using the information collected during blood tests, imaging and other diagnostic testing.

He supports Serious Fun, a camp for children with terminal illness, and a therapeutic horse-riding camp for the disabled.

Kahn founded Zalul in 1999, a non-profit foundation which cleans bodies of water in Israel.

Founded by Morris Kahn, SpaceIL is the first to sign a launch agreement for a private moon mission on the SpaceX Falcon 9 Launcher. SpaceIL hoped to land an Israeli spacecraft on the moon in either 2017 or 2018, but delays arose, and it was targeted for 11 April 2019. The attempt was unsuccessful, the engine cut out at around 10 km height and the spacecraft crashed into the Moon. Still the mission was seen as a success.

He started the Youth Leadership Program called LEAD, dedicated to developing the next generation of leaders.

Kahn is a supporter of Ben-Gurion University and the National Institute for Biotechnology of the Negev.

The Morris Kahn Institute for Human Immunology was funded by Kahn.

In conjunction with the Weizman Institute, he founded the Kahn Family Research Center for Systems Biology of the Human Cell.

Kahn supports the Morris Kahn and Maccabi Health Data Science Institute, to create a database for the 2.5 million members of the Maccabi Healthcare Services organization.

He sponsors an Omo Valley and Jinka, Ethiopia-based project, Jinka Eye Camp, for volunteer Israeli surgeons to perform operations to restore eyesight to people living in rural villages suffering from eye diseases such as cataracts and trachoma.

Honours
Kahn was named honorary president of the 20th Maccabiah by Maccabi World Union Chairman Yair Hamburger in November 2016, and opened the Games in July, 2017 in Jerusalem.

Bar-Ilan University awarded Kahn an honorary doctorate for his support, bringing state-of-the-art labs and equipment to the university.

In 2018, Kahn was given a Bonei Zion Prize Lifetime Achievement Award.

Personal life 
Kahn has two sons, David and Benjamin Kahn, a marine biologist, who was a Time Magazine hero for his work on the environment.

Morris Kahn was married to his late wife, Jacqueline, until the time of her death in 2011.

He lives in Beit Yanai, north of Tel Aviv.

References

1930 births
Israeli billionaires
Israeli Jews
Living people
People from Benoni
South African emigrants to Israel
South African Jews
Bonei Zion Prize recipients